The Upper Downtown Canton Historic District, located in Canton, Ohio, was added to the National Register of Historic Places in 2006. The district encompasses the northern area of downtown Canton.

The district is significant because of its central position in the growing commerce of Canton during the 19th and early 20th centuries as well as for its examples of Classic Revival architecture and engineering.

References

Neoclassical architecture in Ohio
Historic districts in Stark County, Ohio
National Register of Historic Places in Stark County, Ohio
Canton, Ohio
Historic districts on the National Register of Historic Places in Ohio